Jana Novotná was the defending champion but lost in the quarterfinals to Sabine Appelmans.

Appelmans won in the final 6–4, 6–2 against Julie Halard-Decugis.

Seeds
A champion seed is indicated in bold text while text in italics indicates the round in which that seed was eliminated.

  Magdalena Maleeva (second round)
  Jana Novotná (quarterfinals)
  Julie Halard-Decugis (final)
  Helena Suková (semifinals)
  Judith Wiesner (quarterfinals)
  Sabine Appelmans (champion)
  Åsa Carlsson (quarterfinals)
  Silvia Farina (second round)

Draw

External links
 1996 EA-Generali Ladies Linz Draw

1996 WTA Tour